Lucas Tauzin (born 21 May 1998) is a French rugby union wing or centre. He currently plays for Stade Toulousain in the Top 14.

Honours

Club 
 Toulouse
Top 14: 2018–19

International 
 France (U20)
Six Nations Under 20s Championship winners: 2018
World Rugby Under 20 Championship winners: 2018

References

External links
Toulouse profile
L'Équipe profile

1998 births
Living people
Sportspeople from Landes (department)
French rugby union players
Stade Toulousain players
Rugby union wings
Rugby union centres
People from Mont-de-Marsan
Stade Montois players